Marius Cătălin Staicu (born 11 June 1987) is a Romanian professional footballer who plays as a forward for Liga III side Pobeda Stár Bišnov.

Honours
CSM Reșița
Liga III: 2018–19

References

External links
 
 

1987 births
Living people
Romanian footballers
Association football forwards
Liga I players
Liga II players
Liga III players
CSM Reșița players
CS Sportul Snagov players
ACS Poli Timișoara players
CS Șoimii Pâncota players
SCM Râmnicu Vâlcea players
CS Gaz Metan Mediaș players
CS Mioveni players
SSU Politehnica Timișoara players
FC Ripensia Timișoara players
Sportspeople from Timișoara